This is a list of all the yachts built by Jongert, sorted by year.

1975–1994

1995–2004

2005–2015

Under construction

See also
 List of large sailing yachts
 List of motor yachts by length
 Luxury yacht
 Jongert

References

Jongert
Built by Jongert
Built by Jongert
Jongert
Lists of sailing ships